Lee Hoe-taek (Hangul: 이회택; born August 28, 1993), better known by the mononym Hui (Hangul: 후이) is a South Korean singer, songwriter and composer. He debuted as the leader of the South Korean boy group Pentagon under Cube Entertainment. He was also a member of the co-ed trio Triple H from 2017 to 2018, and is the leader of the trot boy group Super Five. Hui participates in writing and producing a majority of Pentagon's songs, most notably "Shine", "Naughty Boy", "Daisy", and "Do or Not". He produces songs for other artists as well, with some of his best-known works being Wanna One's "Energetic", Nation's Son's "Never", Produce X 101's "Boyness", and JO1's "Oh-Eh-Oh". As of December 2022, the Korea Music Copyright Association has 62 songs listed under his name.

All credits are adapted from the Korea Music Copyright Association, unless stated otherwise.

Solo work

Pentagon albums/singles

Other works by Pentagon

Other artists

Others

See also
 List of songs recorded by Pentagon

References 

Hui
Hui
Songs